The 2021 Empress's Cup Final was the final of the 2021 Empress's Cup, the 43rd edition of the Empress's Cup.

The match was contested at the Sanga Stadium by Kyocera in Kyoto.

Teams

Road to the final

Format 
The final was played as a single match. If tied after regulation time, extra time and, would it necessary, a penalty shoot-out would have been used to decide the winning team.

Details

References

External links 
 Empress's Cup JFA 43rd Japan Football Championship 
 天皇杯 JFA 第43回全日本サッカー選手権大会 

2021 in Japanese football
2021 in Asian football
2021 in Japanese sport
Emperors Cup Final, 2021